

Key

Coaches

References

Army

Army Black Knights football coaches